Divisional general was a military rank of the Kingdom of Yugoslavia, in existence from 1923 to 1945. It was introduced by the Law on the Organization of the Army and Navy from 19 July 1923. In order to be promoted to divisional general, an Royal Yugoslav Army officer had previously to have finished higher Military Academy, had successfully commanded with brigade area or similar division formation at least one year, while an Royal Yugoslav Army Air Force officer had to command air force brigades. The rank was used for army and air force officers, while the Royal Yugoslav Navy had its own rank of Vice admiral that was equal to divisional general.

References

Sources
 

Generals
Military ranks of Yugoslavia
Royal Yugoslav Army